Jung Yoon-sik is a South Korean footballer who last played for Nay Pyi Taw.

Career statistics

Club

Notes

References

Living people
South Korean footballers
South Korean expatriate footballers
Association football midfielders
Myanmar National League players
Expatriate footballers in Myanmar
South Korean expatriate sportspeople in Myanmar
Year of birth missing (living people)